The 8 Metre was a sailing event on the Sailing at the 1932 Summer Olympics program in Los Angeles Harbor. Four races were scheduled plus possible tie breakers. 18 sailors, on 2 boats, from 2 nations competed.

Race schedule

Course area and course configuration 
The courses had been well prepared. The marks were laid by the United States Lighthouse Service in the form of large Government. Visiting yachts were kept at a safe distance from the racing boats by the US Coast Guard. Tows were arranged by the US Navy to and from Los Angeles Harbor to the race area. The 8 Metre sailed outside the breakwater.

Weather conditions

Final results

Daily standings

Notes 
 For this event one yacht from each country, crewed by a maximum of 6 amateurs (maximum number of substitutes 6) was allowed.
 This event was a gender independent event. However it turned out that only men participated.

Other information 
During the Sailing regattas at the 1932 Summer Olympics among others the following persons were competing in the 8 Metre:

Further reading

References 

8 Metre
8 Metre (keelboat)